Balmoral chicken is a popular Scottish dish featuring chicken breast stuffed with haggis, wrapped in bacon and served with a whisky or peppercorn sauce. Balmoral chicken is named after Balmoral castle in Aberdeenshire. As a dish featuring haggis it is a popular choice for a Burns supper, a national holiday to celebrate the life of poet Robert Burns.

Dish 
Balmoral chicken is typically served with mashed tatties and peas or another vegetable of choice. It is traditionally covered with a whisky cream sauce, although peppercorn sauce is a popular alternative.

References

Scottish cuisine
Chicken dishes
Haggis